Ius privatum is Latin for private law. Contrasted with ius publicum (the laws relating to the state), ius privatum regulated the relations between individuals. In Roman law this included personal, property and civil law. Judicial proceeding was a private process (iudicium privatum). Criminal law was also considered private matters, except where the crimes were particularly severe.

Lex Aquilia

The lex Aquilia was a plebiscite which codified the law on damage to person and property through a particular fault. It is a forerunner of the modern law of tort.

Stipulatio

Stipulatio was the basic form of contract in Roman law. It was made in the format of question and answer. The precise nature of the contract was disputed, as can be seen below.

Vindicatio

Rei vindicatio is a legal action by which the plaintiff demands that the defendant return a thing that belongs to the plaintiff. It may only be used when plaintiff owns the thing, and the defendant is somehow impeding the plaintiff's possession of the thing. The plaintiff could also institute an actio furti (a personal action) in order to punish the defendant. If the thing could not be recovered, the plaintiff could claim damages from the defendant with the aid of the condictio furtiva (a personal action). With the aid of the actio legis Aquiliae (a personal action), the plaintiff could claim damages from the defendant. Rei vindicatio was derived from the ius civile, therefore was only available to Roman citizens.

See also
Privatus

Roman law
Latin legal terminology